Damgard may refer to:

People
Ivan Damgård (born 1956), Danish cryptographer

Other
Damgård–Jurik cryptosystem
Merkle–Damgård construction